Willy Stöwer (22 May 1864 – 31 May 1931) was a German artist, illustrator and author during the Imperial Period. He is best known for nautical paintings and lithographs. Many of his works depict historical maritime events such as the sinking of the RMS Titanic in 1912.

Life 
Willy Stöwer, the son of a sea captain, was born in Wolgast, Germany on the Baltic coast. He originally trained as a metalworker and worked as a technician in the engineering offices of various German shipyards. He soon received commissions as a draftsman, illustrator and painter. His talent was recognized early and his painting technique was self-taught. In 1892 he married Henrietta Dettmann from a wealthy family, and this allowed him to devote himself exclusively to his work as an artist.

Kaiser Wilhelm II became an enthusiastic supporter and patron of the artist and Stöwer was said to be the Kaiser's favorite naval painter. Stöwer even accompanied the Emperor on several voyages between 1905 and 1912. He was a board member of the German Navy League and was awarded an honorary professorship in 1907. The course of his life then followed that of his patron and the fate of the Imperial German Navy.  As with contemporaries such as Hans Bohrdt, his greatest creative period came to an end with the abdication of the Kaiser and the passing of the Imperial era. His later career, being without Imperial favor, relied on a few commissions from steamship lines. He died in relative obscurity at his Berlin-Tegel villa on 31 May 1931, nine days after his 67th birthday. Stöwer is interred in Cemetery III of the Jerusalem and New Churches in Berlin, where the grave remains preserved.

Career 

Stöwer was a very prolific artist between 1892 and 1929, creating approximately 900 black-and-white and 335 color illustrations for 57 books, as well as posters, postcards, trading-cards, labels, brochures and calendars. An early example of his Commercial art is a series of trading cards from 1899 to 1900 which he made for the German chocolate producer Stollwerck entitled The New German Warships in Scrapbook No. 3, Series 132.

He created the illustration shortly after the disaster in 1912 without detailed information, in particular, the fourth funnel did not eject black smoke as it was only for ventilation. However, the image became iconic despite minor errors and has been reprinted numerous times even to the present day. Stöwer, not known for portraiture, also painted a portrait of the Kaiser in a naval uniform, which along with some of his naval paintings, hang in the Kaiser's Room at Achilleion, the Kaiser's summer palace from 1907 to 1914 (currently a museum) on the Island of Corfu.

Other examples of Stöwer's work currently in museums include oil on canvas: Sinking of the Italian destroyer "Turbine" by Austrian destroyers on 24 May 1915. at the Military History Museum, Vienna, and: Speedboat ahead! at International Maritime Museum of Hamburg. In 1917, postcards were produced from some of his paintings for charitable aid to benefit wounded U-boat crew members and families of the deceased during World War I.

Gallery

Published works 
In addition to his works in the visual arts, he wrote, published or edited several German books, and is credited as co-author on many more. Books by Willy Stöwer include:
 1929 : To Sea with Brush and Palette.  Includes reminiscences of the author's voyages with Kaiser Wilhelm II.
 1916 : German U-boat Actions, in Words and Pictures. Published collection of reproductions of paintings of submarines; text in German on pages facing illustrations.
 1912 : Kaiser Wilhelm II and the Navy. Conceived in honor of 25th anniversary of the Kaiser's rule.
 1905 : The German Sailing Sport.  (Editor) Stöwer's comprehensive compendium of the German sailing sport from the early heyday of yachting in the German Empire.
 1901 : Marine ABC. Children's alphabet book
 1900 : German Fleet Maneuvers: After Watercolors and Studies.
 1898 : Germany's Navy: With use of Official Materials for Original Watercolors. 

Biography (monograph) by Jörg M. Hormann: Marine Painter of the Empire, Willy Stöwer

See also
List of German artists

Notes

References

External links
 

19th-century German painters
19th-century German male artists
German male painters
20th-century German painters
20th-century German male artists
German marine artists
German illustrators
1864 births
1931 deaths
People from Wolgast